Paracosmus morrisoni is a species of bee flies in the family Bombyliidae.

References

Bombyliidae
Articles created by Qbugbot
Insects described in 1887